Hickory Grove Township is a township in Scott County, Iowa, USA.  As of the 2000 census, its population was 671.

Geography
According to the USGS, it contains four cemeteries: Burch, Linn Grove, Maysville and O'Toole.

Transportation
Hickory Grove Township contains one airport or landing strip, Stender Airport.

References
 USGS Geographic Names Information System (GNIS)

External links
 US-Counties.com
 City-Data.com

Townships in Scott County, Iowa
Townships in Iowa